Nationality words link to articles with information on the nation's poetry or literature (for instance, Irish or France).

Events
 May 12 — John Montague is named as first holder of The Ireland Chair of Poetry.
 August — English poet and playwright Tony Harrison's film-poem Prometheus is first shown.
 Fall — Skanky Possum poetry magazine founded in Austin, Texas.
 Samizdat poetry magazine founded in Chicago (it will run until 2004).

Works published in English
Listed by nation where the work was first published and again by the poet's native land, if different; substantially revised works listed separately:

Australia
 Robert Gray, New Selected Poems
 Jennifer Harrison, Dear B (Black Pepper)
 Frieda Hughes, Wooroloo, English-born Australian poet, originally published in United States by Harper Flamingo
 John Leonard, editor, Australian Verse: An Oxford Anthology, Melbourne: Oxford University Press (anthology)
 Philip Salom, New and Selected Poems. (Fremantle Arts Centre) 
 John Tranter, Late Night Radio, Polygon Press
 Chris Wallace-Crabbe, Whirling, Oxford: Oxford University Press

Canada
 Gary Barwin, Outside the Hat, (Coach House Books) 
 Stephen Cain, dislexicon (Coach House Books) 
 Anne Carson, Autobiography of Red: A Novel in Verse (Knopf); a New York Times "notable book of the year"
 Margaret Christakos, The Moment Coming (Oakville: ECW)
 Don Domanski, Parish of the Psychic Moon
 Louis Dudek, The Poetry of Louis Dudek. Ottawa: The Golden Dog.
 Paul Dutton, Aurealities, (Coach House Books) 
 Michael Holmes, Satellite Dishes from the Future Bakery, (Coach House Books) 
 Sylvia Legris, Iridium Seeds
 Dorothy Livesay, Archive for Our Times: Previously Uncollected and Unpublished Poems of Dorothy Livesay, Irvine Dean ed. Vancouver: Arsenal Pulp Press.
 Michael Ondaatje, Handwriting, Toronto: McClelland & Stewart; New York: Knopf, 1999 
 E. J. Pratt, Selected Poems of E. J. Pratt, Sandra Djwa, W.J. Keith, and Zailig Pollock  ed. Toronto: University of Toronto Press.

Canadian anthologies
 Allan Forrie, Patrick O'Rourke, and Glen Sorestad, editors, In the Clear: A Contemporary Canadian Poetry Anthology, Saskatoon: Thistledown Press
 Kwame Dawes, editor, Wheel and Come Again: An Anthology of Reggae Poetry, Fredericton, New Brunswick: Goose Lane

India, in English
 Arvind Krishna Mehrotra, The Transfiguring Places ( Poetry in English ), Ravi Dayal, New Delhi, 
 K. Satchidanandan, How to go to the Tao Temple, Har-Anand Publications, New Delhi.
 Dilip Chitre, The Mountain, Pune: Vijaya Chitre

Ireland
 Dermot Bolger, Taking my Letters Back: New and Selected Poems, Dublin: New Island Books
 Ciaran Carson:
 The Alexandrine Plan, Oldcastle: The Gallery Press, 
 The Twelfth of Never, Oldcastle: The Gallery Press, 
 Peter Fallon, News of the World, Oldcastle: The Gallery Press, 

New Zealand
 Raewyn Alexander, Concrete, Auckland: Penguin
 Alan Brunton, Moonshine, Bumper Books
 Roger Robinson and Nelson Wattie, editors, The Oxford Companion to New Zealand Literature,  Melbourne; Auckland: Oxford University Press
 Kate Camp, Unfamiliar Legends of the Stars, Victoria University Press

United Kingdom
 Ciarán Carson: The Alexandrine Plan, (adaptations of sonnets by Baudelaire, Mallarmé, and Rimbaud); Gallery :Press, Wake Forest University Press
 Carol Ann Duffy, The Pamphlet, Anvil Press Poetry
 Paul Farley, The Boy from the Chemist is Here to See You Salena Godden, The Fire People Seamus Heaney:
 Audenesque, Maeght
 Translator, Beowulf Opened Ground: Poems 1966-1996, Faber & Faber; in the United States, published by Farrar, Straus & Giroux; a New York Times "notable book of the year" for 1999
 Paul Henry, The Milk Thief, Seren
 Ted Hughes:
 Birthday Letters, (Farrar, Straus & Giroux); a verse chronicle of the author's relationship with Sylvia Plath, his late wife; a New York Times "notable book of the year"
 Translator, Phedre Jackie Kay, Off Colour United Kingdom
 Peter Levi, Reed Music Kevin MacNeil, Love and Zen in the Outer Hebrides, Scottish poet published in Scotland
 Andrew Motion, Selected Poems 1976–1997 Paul Muldoon, Hay Carol Rumens, Holding Pattern Jo Shapcott, My Life Asleep Jon Stallworthy, Rounding the HornAnthologies in the United Kingdom
 Simon Armitage and Robert Crawford, editors, Penguin Book of Poetry from Britain and Ireland Since 1945, Viking, 
 Sean O'Brien, editor, The Firebox: Poetry in Britain and Ireland after 1945 (Picador), anthology
 Lloyd Searwar, editor, They Came in Ships: An Anthology of Indo-Guyanese Prose and Poetry,Leeds: Peepal Tree

Criticism, scholarship and biography in the United Kingdom
Sean O'Brien, The Deregulated Muse: Essays on Contemporary British and Irish Poetry (Bloodaxe), criticism
 John Heath-Stubbs, The literary essays of John Heath-Stubbs, edited by A.T. Tolley
 Michael Schmidt, Lives of the Poets, London: Weidenfeld and Nicolson

United States
 John Ashbery:
 The Mooring of Starting Out: The First Five Books of Poetry (Ecco)  collection of the poet's work from 1956 to 1972; a New York Times "notable book of the year"
 Wakefulness Renée Ashley, The Various Reasons of Light Ted Berrigan, Great Stories of the Chair Henri Cole, The Visible Man Billy Collins, Picnic, Lightning
 Fanny Howe, Q Deborah Garrison, A Working Girl Can't Win: And Other Poems, (Random House); a New York Times "notable book of the year"
 Lee Harwood, Morning Light Kenneth Koch, Straits: Poems, New York: Knopf 
William Logan, Vain Empires: Poems, (Penguin, paper); a New York Times "notable book of the year"
 W. S. Merwin:
 Translator, East Window: The Asian Translations, translated poems from earlier collections, Port Townsend, Washington: Copper Canyon Press
 The Folding Cliffs: A Narrative, a "novel-in-verse" New York: Knopf
Michael Palmer, The Lion Bridge: Selected Poems 1972-1995 (New Directions), first retrospective of Palmer's work selected by the author himself reprinting much work that had gone out of print
 Carl Phillips, From the DevotionsMarie Ponsot, The Bird Catcher, winner of the National Book Critics Circle Award and finalist for the 1999 Lenore Marshall Poetry Prize
Frederick Seidel Going Fast: Poems, (Farrar, Straus & Giroux);  a New York Times "notable book of the year"
Mark Strand, Blizzard of One: Poems,  (Knopf); a New York Times "notable book of the year"; by a Canadian native long living in and published in the United States
Patti Smith, Patti Smith CompleteJames Tate, Shroud of the Gnomes: Poems, (Ecco); a New York Times "notable book of the year"
Richard Tayson, The Apprentice of Fever, winner of the 1997 Stan and Tom Wick Poetry Prize
 Keith and Rosmarie Waldrop, Well Well Reality (The Post-Apollo Press)

Criticism, scholarship and biography in the United States
 Laurence Breiner, An Introduction to West Indian Poetry, Cambridge University Press, scholarship
 Kenneth Koch, Making Your Own Days: The Pleasures of Reading and Writing Poetry, New York: Scribner
 Eric L. Haralson, editor, Encyclopedia of American Poetry: The Nineteenth Century, Chicago and London: Fitzroy Dearborn
 Mary Oliver, Rules for the Dance: A Handbook for Writing and Reading Metrical VerseAnthologies in the United States
 Barbara Tran, Monique T. D. Truong, and Luu Truong Khoi, editors, Watermark: Vietnamese American Poetry & Prose, New York: Asian American Writers' Workshop

Poets in The Best American Poetry 1998
Poems from these 75 poets were in The Best American Poetry 1999, general editor David Lehman, guest editor John Hollander:

Jonathan Aaron
Agha Shahid Ali
Dick Allen
A. R. Ammons
Daniel Anderson
James Applewhite
Craig Arnold
Sarah Arvio
John Ashbery
Frank Bidart
Robert Bly
George Bradley
John Bricuth
Anne Carson
Turner Cassity

Henri Cole
Billy Collins
Alfred Corn
James Cummins
Thomas M. Disch
Denise Duhamel
Lynn Emanuel
Irving Feldman
Emily Fragos
Debora Greger
Allen Grossman
Thom Gunn
Marilyn Hacker
Rachel Hadas
Donald Hall

Joseph Harrison
Anthony Hecht
Daryl Hine
Edward Hirsch
Richard Howard
Andrew Hudgins
Mark Jarman
Donald Justice
Brigit Pegeen Kelly
Karl Kirchwey
Carolyn Kizer
Kenneth Koch
John Koethe
Rika Lesser
Phillis Levin

Philip Levine
Rebecca McClanahan
J. D. McClatchy
Heather McHugh
Sandra McPherson
W. S. Merwin
Robert Mezey
A. F. Moritz
Thylias Moss
William Mullen
Eric Ormsby
Jacqueline Osherow
Robert Pinsky
Reynolds Price
Wyatt Prunty

Stephen Sandy
Alan Shapiro
Robert B. Shaw
Charles Simic
Mark Strand
James Tate
Sidney Wade
Derek Walcott
Rosanna Warren
Rachel Wetzsteon
Susan Wheeler
Richard Wilbur
C. K. Williams
Greg Williamson
Charles Wright

Works published in other languages
Listed by nation where the work was first published and again by the poet's native land, if different; substantially revised works listed separately:

Denmark
 Klaus Høeck; Denmark:
 Hjem, publisher: Gyldendal
 Honeymoon, publisher: Gyldendal
 Inger Christensen, Samlede digte ("Collected Poems")

French language

France
 Olivier Barbarant, Odes dérisoires et quelques autres un peu moins, publisher: Editions Champ Vallon, 
 Salah Stetie, Fievre et guerison de l'icone Jean-Michel Maulpoix, Domaine publicIndia
Listed in alphabetical order by first name:
 Amarjit Chandan, Chhanna, Navyug, New Delhi; Punjabi-language
 Anamika, Anushtup, Delhi: Kitab Ghar; Hindi-language
 Gagan Gill, Yah Akanksha Samay Nahin, New Delhi: Rajkamal Prakashan, New Delhi, 1998, Bharatiya Jnanpith; Hindi-language
 K. Satchidanandan, Apoornam, ("Imperfect"); Malayalam-language
 Kynpham Sing Nongkynrih, Ban Sngewthuh ia ka Poitri ("Understanding Poetry"), Shillong: Gautam Brothers; Khasi-language
 Mallika Sengupta; Hindi-language:
 Meyeder Aa Aaa Ka Kha, Kolkata: Prativas Publication
 Translator, Akaler Madhye Saras, translation from the original Hindi of Kedarnath Singh, Kolkata: Sahitya Akademi
 Manushya Puthiran, Itamum Iruppum, Nagercoil: Kalachuvadu Pathipagam, Tamil language
 Prathibha Nandakumar, Kavadeyata ("Game of Cowry"), Bangalore: Kannada Sangha, Christ College
 Raghavan Atholi, Mozhimattam, Kottayam: Sahitya Pravarthaka Cooperative Society (SPCS)
 Rajendra Bhandari, Kshar/Akshar ("Perishable/ Imperishable"), Gangtok, Sikkim: Jana Paksha Prakashan; Nepali-language
 Varavara Rao (better known as "VV"), Aa Rojulu ("Those Days"), Hyderabad: Akruti Printers

Poland
 Stanisław Barańczak, Chirurgiczna precyzja ("Surgical Precision"), Krakow: a5
 Zbigniew Herbert:
 89 wierszy, ("89 Poems"), Kraków: a5
 Epilog burzy ("Epilogue to a Storm"), Wrocław: Wydawnictwo Dolnośląskie
 Ewa Lipska:
 Godziny poza godzinami ("Hours Beyond Hours"), selected poems, Warsaw: PIW
 Życie zastępcze, Kraków: Wydawnictwo literackie
 Jan Twardowski:
 Bóg prosi o miłość - Gott fleht um Liebe, Krakow, Poland: Wydawnictwo Literackie
 Niebo w dobrym humorze, Warsaw: PIW
 Adam Zagajewski, Trzej aniołowie, Three Angels (sic) Kraków: Wydawnictwo Literackie

Serbia
 Dejan Stojanović, Krugovanje: 1978–1987 (Circling), Second Edition, Narodna knjiga–Alfa, Beograd

Spain
 Matilde Camus, Fuerza creativa ("Creative strength")

Other languages
 Christoph Buchwald, general editor, and Marcel Beyer, guest editor, Jahrbuch der Lyrik 1998/99 ("Poetry Yearbook 1998/99"), publisher: Beck; anthology
 Ndoc Gjetja, Dhjata ime ("My Testament"); Albania
 Haim Gouri Ha-Shirim ("The Poems"), in two volumes by an Israeli writing in Hebrew
 Chen Kehua, Yinwei siwang er jingying de fanfu shipian ("Engaging in a Complicated Poetry for the Sake of Death ") Chinese (Taiwan)
 Maria Luisa Spaziani, La traversata dell'oasi, Italy
 Rahman Henry, Banbhojoner Moto Aundhokar ( Darkness as Picnic is), Bengali

Awards and honors

Australia
 C. J. Dennis Prize for Poetry: Coral Hull, Broken Land Kenneth Slessor Prize for Poetry: No awards were presented this year
 Mary Gilmore Prize: Lucy Dougan, Memory ShellCanada
 Archibald Lampman Award: Sandra Nicholls, Woman of Sticks, Woman of Stones Atlantic Poetry Prize: Carmelita McGrath, To the New World Gerald Lampert Award: Mark Sinnett, The Landing 1998 Governor General's Awards: Stephanie Bolster, White Stone: The Alice Poems (English); Suzanne Jacob, La Part de feu / Le Deuil de la rancune (French)
 Pat Lowther Award: Barbara Nickel, The Gladys Elegies Prix Alain-Grandbois: Paul Chanel Malenfant, Fleuves Dorothy Livesay Poetry Prize: Patricia Young, What I Remember from My Time on Earth Prix Émile-Nelligan: Tony Tremblay, Rue Pétrole-OcéanIndia
 Sahitya Akademi Award : Arun Kamal for Naye Ilake Mein Poetry Society India National Poetry Competition : K. Srilata for In Santa Cruz, Diagnosed Home Sick

New Zealand
 Prime Minister's Awards for Literary Achievement:
 Montana New Zealand Book Awards (no award given in poetry category this year) First-book award for poetry: Kapka Kassabova, All Roads Lead to the Sea, Auckland University Press

United Kingdom
 Cholmondeley Award: Roger McGough, Robert Minhinnick, Anne Ridler, Ken Smith
 Eric Gregory Award: Mark Goodwin, Joanne Limburg, Patrick McGuinness, Kona Macphee, Esther Morgan, Christiania Whitehead, Frances Williams
 Forward Poetry Prize Best Collection: Ted Hughes, Birthday Letters (Faber and Faber)
 Forward Poetry Prize Best First Collection: Paul Farley, The Boy from the Chemist is Here to See You (Picador)
 Queen's Gold Medal for Poetry: Les Murray
 T. S. Eliot Prize (United Kingdom and Ireland): Ted Hughes, Birthday Letters (Faber and Faber)
 Whitbread Award for poetry and for book of the year: Ted Hughes, Birthday Letters (Faber and Faber)
 National Poetry Competition : Caroline Carver for Horse Underwater 

United States
 Agnes Lynch Starrett Poetry Prize: Shara McCallum, The Water Between Us Aiken Taylor Award for Modern American Poetry: X.J. Kennedy
 American Academy of Arts and Letters Gold Medal for Drama: Horton Foote
 American Academy of Arts and Letters: Robert Fagles elected a member of the Literature Department
American Book Award: Angela Y. Davis, "Blues Legacies and Black Feminism: Gertrude "Ma" Rainey, Bessie Smith, and Billie Holiday"
American Book Award: Allison Hedge Coke, "Dog Road Woman", Coffee House Press "American Book Award 1998"
 AML Award for poetry to Alex Caldiero for Various Atmospheres: Poems and Drawings Bernard F. Connors Prize for Poetry: Sherod Santos, "Elegy for My Sister", and (separately) Neil Azevedo, "Caspar Hauser Songs"
 Bobbitt National Prize for Poetry: Frank Bidart, Desire National Book Award for poetry: Gerald Stern, This Time: New and Selected Poems Poet Laureate of Virginia: Joseph Awad, two year appointment 1998 to 2000
 Pulitzer Prize for Poetry: Charles Wright, Black Zodiac Ruth Lilly Poetry Prize: W.S. Merwin
 Wallace Stevens Award: A. R. Ammons
 William Carlos Williams Award: John Balaban, Locusts at the Edge of Summer: New and Selected Poems'', Judge: Robert Phillips
 Whiting Awards: Nancy Eimers, Daniel Hall, James Kimbrell, Charles Harper Webb, Greg Williamson
 Fellowship of the Academy of American Poets: Charles Simic

Births
 Amanda Gorman, American poet

Deaths
Birth years link to the corresponding "[year] in poetry" article:
 January 23 — John Forbes, 47 (born 1915), Australian poet
 February 8
 Enoch Powell, 85 (born 1912), British MP from 1950 to 1987, classicist and poet
 Niall Sheridan, 85 (born 1912), Irish poet, fiction writer and broadcaster
 March 23 — Hilda Morley, 81 (born 1916), American poet, after a fall
 April 19 — Octavio Paz, 84 (born 1914), Mexican writer, poet, diplomat and winner of the 1990 Nobel Prize in Literature
 April 21 — Ivan Chtcheglov, 65 (born 1933), French political theorist, activist and poet
 April 30 — Nizar Qabbani, 75 (born 1923), Syrian diplomat, poet and publisher of Arabic poetry
 May 29 — Philip O'Connor, 81 (born 1916), English writer and surrealist poet
 June 25 — John Malcolm Brinnin, 81 (born 1916), American poet and critic
 July 1 — Martin Seymour-Smith, 70 (born 1928), English poet, critic and biographer
 July 14 — Miroslav Holub, 75 (born 1923), Czech poet and immunologist
 July 28 — Zbigniew Herbert, 73 (born 1924), influential Polish poet, essayist and moralist
 August 26 — Ryūichi Tamura 田村隆, 75 (born 1923), Japanese Shōwa period poet, essayist and translator of English-language novels and poetry
 October 25 – Dick Higgins, 60 (born 1938), English-born poet, composer and early Fluxus artist with ties to the Language poets
 October 28 — Ted Hughes, 68 (born 1930), English poet, Poet Laureate of the United Kingdom since 1984
 Date not known
 Aimee Joan Grunberger, 44, American poet, of cancer
 Michalis Katsaros (born 1919), Greek poet

See also

Poetry
List of years in poetry
List of poetry awards

Notes

20th-century poetry
Poetry